Eriogonum longifolium Nutt. var. gnaphalifolium Gand. (also known as Eriogonum floridanum Small), commonly referred to as scrub buckwheat is a dicot of the Polygonaceae (smartweed or knotweed) family. It is listed as threatened in the US and endangered in Florida. Within Florida its most closely related species is Eriogonum tomentosum however there are three other varieties of Eriogonum longifolium found in other areas of the US.

Scrub buckwheat is found in areas of scrub, flatland and sand hills.

Description
It is described as generally having no more than three flowering stems, but stronger plants may have more. Its flowers are described as emerging from an involucre or protective cup found on each branch of its terminal corymb. Flowers are pollinated by a variety of solitary bees, solitary digger wasps and twig nesting wasps, flies and social wasps.

According to the US Fish and Wildlife Service there is an active habitat management program. Also, there is significant interest in studying its fire tolerance and tendency to bloom or to die following prescribed burning of competing undergrowth.

See also
 Eriogonum longifolium var. harperi
 Eriogonum longifolium var. lindheimeri

References

External links
 Species Account/Biologue - USFWS webpage for Scrub Buckwheat
 USFWS 1993 - Final ruling regarding seven central Florida plants, including E. longifolium var. gnaphalifolium

longifolium var. gnaphalifolium
Flora of the Southeastern United States
Flora of Florida
Threatened flora of the United States